Guaçu Piteri (6 April 1935 – 6 June 2021) was a Brazilian politician who served as a deputy of São Paulo (1975–1977).
He also served as the 2nd mayor of Osasco (1967–1970) and as the 5th mayor of Osasco (1977–1982).

References

1935 births
2021 deaths
Brazilian sociologists
Members of the Legislative Assembly of São Paulo
Members of the Chamber of Deputies (Brazil) from São Paulo
Mayors of places in Brazil
Democratic Labour Party (Brazil) politicians
Brazilian Democratic Movement politicians
Cidadania politicians
University of São Paulo alumni
People from Osasco